Milnerton High School (abbreviated to and compassionately known as MHS) is a public English medium co-educational high school for Grades 8 to 12, situated in the Milnerton suburb of Cape Town, Western Cape, South Africa.

The school was founded in 1959, and expanded continually - particularly since the early 2000s - to welcome students coming from well beyond central Milnerton. It now serves students residing in both affluent suburbs and townships surrounding Milnerton.

Academics
Milnerton High School has been notably well-performing, achieving a 100% Grade 12 pass rate for 16 years in a row, from 2004 until 2019. The school's academic performance regularly exceeds the average public school's expectation, with an exceptionally high pass rate averaging 99.9% yearly between 2004 and 2020, compared to the average national pass rate of 78.4% between 2017 and 2020. Over the years, several top achieving students and alumni from Milnerton High School have also made headlines on several local and national newspapers.

Other than the generally compulsory subjects of English (Home Language) and Afrikaans (First Additional Language), the school offers a variety of subjects at a Further Education and Training level (FET, i.e. Grades 10 to 12):
Mathematics (Maths) or Mathematical Literacy (Maths Lit)
Physical Sciences
Life Sciences (Biology)
Accounting
Business Studies
Economics (from 2023)
Computer Applications Technology (CAT)
Consumer Studies (Home Economics)
Design
Dramatic Arts (Drama)
Visual Art
Geography
History
Tourism
Music
The school also offers external subjects. These subjects are generally taught after normal school hours and not on school grounds, and are:
Advanced Programme Mathematics (AP Maths, somewhat similar but not identical to the United States' Advanced Placement Math programme)
Information Technology (IT)

Sport

Rugby 
Milnerton High School's Rugby First Team and Old Boys Teams compete in provincial tournaments. The Milnerton Old Boys Association enters teams into international rugby tournaments, and in early 2020 competed in the Cape Town Tens Rugby Tournament. The team was invited to compete in the 2010 Malaysian Rugby Tens Tournament.

Notable alumni
 Damian de Allende, player in South Africa's national rugby team, the Springboks
 Wouter Basson, cardiologist
 Jim Murphy, former Scottish Labour Member of Parliament for East Renfrewshire and former Minister of State for Europe
 Mark Nigrini, professor at West Virginia University 
 Ethan du Preez, Olympic swimmer who competed in the 2020 Summer Olympics.
 Natasha Thahane, actress and model

References

Schools in Cape Town
Educational institutions established in 1959
1959 establishments in South Africa